Heidi Kjær is a Danish former international cricketer who represented the Danish national team between 1990 and 1997.

References

Living people
Danish women cricketers
Denmark women One Day International cricketers
Year of birth missing (living people)